Not Yet is an album by drummer Art Blakey and the Jazz Messengers recorded in Italy in 1988 and released on the Soul Note label.

Reception

Scott Yanow of Allmusic stated "The 1988 edition of The Jazz Messengers, which drummer Art Blakey had been leading for 33 years, showed a great deal of promise... The music may not have contained too many surprises or been startlingly new, but the results are quite pleasing".

Track listing 
 "Kenji's Mood" (Benny Green) - 9:37  
 "For Heaven's Sake" (Elise Bretton, Sherman Edwards, Don Meyer) - 7:21  
 "Not Yet" (Javon Jackson) - 6:45  
 "I'll Never Be The Same" (Gus Kahn, Matty Malneck, Frank Signorelli) - 9:18  
 "Uranus" (Walter Davis, Jr.) - 9:25  
 "Falling in Love with Love" (Lorenz Hart, Richard Rodgers) - 9:18  
 "Kelo" (J. J. Johnson) - 6:58

Personnel 
Art Blakey - drums
Philip Harper - trumpet
Robin Eubanks - trombone
Javon Jackson - tenor saxophone
Benny Green - piano
Peter Washington - bass

References 

Art Blakey albums
The Jazz Messengers albums
1988 albums
Black Saint/Soul Note albums